Dr.Eruani Azibapu Godbless (CFR) (born December 25 1973) is a Nigerian billionaire businessman  and owner of Azikel Group. He also serves as a member of the Advisory Board of University of Port Harcourt Foundation.

Early life and education 
Azibapu was born on December 25, 1973, in Epebu, part of the Ogbia LGA of Bayelsa State, to the Royal Family of Chief Allwell Eruani, (the Obanema of Emadike, Aguda the IX) and Mrs Rachael Eruani. He graduated as a Medical Doctor from the University of Port Harcourt, with postgraduate studies in Surgery and later Family Medicine. Dr Eruani is a member of the American Academy of Family Physicians. In a quest of entrepreneurial knowledge, Dr Eruani obtained certification in the Owner Management Programme (OMP) at the Lagos Business School, Senior Executive Programme (SEP) at the London Business School and the Advance Management Programme (AMP) at the Wharton Business School, University of Pennsylvania. Dr. Eruani has attended several courses in advancement of his knowledge in the Energy and Petroleum sectors. These include "Process, Plant Start-Up Operations for Refinery and Petrochemical" by PTS Inc USA, "Effective Project Management for the Power Project Professional" and "Power Project Finance" by Powergen – USA, the "Global Customer Summit" by GE at CrotonVille – USA, and "Understanding and Structuring Power Purchase Agreement" by INFOCUS – Dubai.

Career 

A medical doctor by training, Azibapu practiced his early medical career with the Westend Clinic and Ashford & Patrick Hospital. He later entered into public service with the Bayelsa State Civil Service as a Medical Officer in the Ministry of Health and subsequently, a professional industrial medical practice career in Nigerian Agip Oil Company.

After serving in the oil and gas Industry, Godbless became Chief Physician to Chief Melford Okilo, the first Civilian Governor of Old Rivers State. He was later appointed as a special adviser on HIV/AIDS and Community Health in the Dr. Goodluck Ebele Jonathan Administration, during the time he was Governor of Bayelsa State. Azibapu was assigned an additional role to supervise as the Chairman of the State Action Committee on AIDS (SACA). He later served as the Commissioner for Health in Bayelsa State.

Azibapu is the founder of Azikel Group, a conglomerate made up of companies in the business of dredging, petroleum refining, power generation, aviation, construction and engineering.

Special skills 
Dr Eruani is a medical Doctor who, developed special skills in medicine, business and aviation.

Dr Eruani obtained his Private Pilot License  in aviation in the United States of America. He owns at least three private jets/aircraft, ranging from helicopter to fixed wings. He owned his first private jet at the age of 36, a Hawker 800XP, then acquired a helicopter, Augusta Westland 109S Grand in 2012. In July 2015 Dr Eruani acquired and took delivery of another new aircraft with extended range the Gulfstream 450, to enhance transcontinental businesses.

Businesses 
The quest for job creation, wealth, financial freedom and economic sustainability spurred Dr Eruani into different business, spanning from sand/aggregate mining and dredging, logistics/ air chatter  services, power generation and petroleum. Dr Eruani owns the Azikel Group, which consist of the following subsidiaries; Azikel Dredging, Azikel Air, Azikel Power and Azikel Petroleum. Azikel Petroleum Ltd is the protagonist of the Azikel Refinery, the First Private Hydroskimming Refinery in Nigeria.

Award and honors 
Dr Eruani Azibapu was nominated for an Award of Excellence by the US Consulate in 2018. 

On August 20, 2018, Dr Eruani received  honour and award of Business Excellency, Innovation and International Partnership at the US Consular in Lagos. The award was presented by the  US Consul-General, F. John Bray, accompanied by the US Head of Commercial, Brent Omadhl.

The Consul-General Bray said this award and  recognition, conferred on Eruani is in the  advancement of  societal growth and development by putting in wheels of industries in motion. The US consulate applaud Dr Eruani for the achievement and progress of the Azikel Refinery, the first private hydroskimming refinery in Nigeria, which will create a multiplier business chain for Nigeria, sustainable wealth, which is a key index of a healthy industrial economy. Dr Eruani has made great success in dredging and aviation. His innovative style and partnership with international organizations is the key to sustainable business development.

In October 2022, a Nigerian national honour of Commander of the Order of the Federal Republic (CFR) was conferred on him by President Muhammadu Buhari.

References

Nigerian businesspeople
1973 births
Living people